Yinz (see  below for other spellings) is a second-person plural pronoun used mainly in Western Pennsylvania English, most prominently in Pittsburgh, but it is also found throughout the cultural region known as Appalachia, located within the geographical region of the Appalachians.

History and usage
Yinz is the most recent derivation from the original Scots-Irish form you ones or "yous ones", a form of the second person plural commonly heard in parts of Ulster. When standard-English speakers talk in the first person or third person, they use different pronouns to distinguish between singular and plural. In the first person, for example, speakers use the singular I and the plural we.  But when speaking in the second person, you performs double duty as both the singular form and the plural form. Crozier (1984) suggests that during the 19th century, when many Irish speakers switched to speaking English, they filled this gap with you ones, primarily because Irish has a singular second-person pronoun, tú, as well as a plural form, sibh. The following, therefore, is the most likely path from you ones to yinz: you ones  > you'uns  > youns  > yunz  > yinz . Because there are still speakers who use each form, there is no stable second-person plural pronoun form in southwest or central Pennsylvania, which is why the pronoun is variably referred to or spelled as you'uns, y'ins, y'uns, yunz, yuns, yinz, yenz, yins or ynz.

In other parts of the U.S., Irish or Scots-Irish speakers encountered the same gap in the second-person plural. For this reason, these speakers are also responsible for coining the yunz used in and around Middletown, Pennsylvania, as well as the youse found mainly in New York City, the Philadelphia dialect and New Jersey, and the ubiquitous y'all of the South.

A similar form with similar Irish/Scots roots is found further north in the Atlantic Provinces of Canada. It is sometimes combined with all for emphasis, as in "Are yous all coming to the party?" This usage is also used widely in Australia  and within Carbon and Schuylkill County, Pennsylvania.

In popular culture
Yinz place as one of Pennsylvania's most famous regionalisms makes it a badge of pride. For example, a group of Pittsburgh area radical cheerleaders call themselves "Yinz Cheer", and an area literary magazine was called The New Yinzer, a take-off of The New Yorker.   Those perceived to be stereotypical blue collar Pittsburgh residents are often referred to as  Yinzers.

Yinztagram is a software program with a Pittsburgh theme.

YinzCam is a Pittsburgh-based software development company.

YinzFans.com is a fan site for Pittsburgh sports fans located outside of the Pittsburgh area.

At the end of every episode of "VH-1's Top 20 Countdown" host Jim Shearer always says "I'm Jim Shearer, and I'll see yinz later."

In the TV series One Dollar (2018) set in a rust belt town (shot in and around Pittsburgh), the Yinz address is frequently used.

Waypoint YINZZ in Newell, West Virginia marks the approach to Pittsburgh International Airport.

See also
 Ye (pronoun)
 Y'all

References

Further reading
Johnstone, B. and Danielson, A., "Pittsburghese" in the Daily Papers, 1910-1998: Historical Sources of Ideology about Variation, New Ways of Analyzing Variation Conference, October 2001.
Johnstone, B., Bhasin, N., and Wittkowski, D., "Dahntahn" Pittsburgh: Monophthongal /aw/ and representations of localness in Southwestern Pennsylvania. American Speech 77(20):146-166.
Johnston, Barbara, Speaking Pittsburghese:  The Story of a Dialect.  Oxford Studies in Sociolinguistics.  Oxford:  OUP.

Crozier, A. (1984). The Scotch-Irish influence on American English. American Speech 59: 310-331.
Austin, S. (2003).  Professor of Smoot History and Cultural Impact.  Smoot's in America 18: 410-411.

External links

Pittsburgh Speech and Society A site for non-linguists, created by Carnegie Mellon University linguist Barbara Johnstone.
Pittsburghese.com (more humorous than scientific)
 What Do You Call a Steeler Fan?
 Are yinz from Pittsburgh?.
PBS Series, "Do You Speak American?"
Pittsburgh City Paper, "Philadelphyinz Reps The Burgh with Brotherly Love"

 
English-language slang
Modern English personal pronouns
Culture of Pittsburgh
Second-person plural pronouns in English